Ann Christy (born Gladys Cronin; May 31, 1905 – November 14, 1987) was an American motion picture actress, whose screen career was relatively brief, spanning only five years, from 1927 in the late silent era to the early years of sound.

Career
Born Gladys Cronin in Logansport, Indiana, Christy left Indiana and relocated to California where she attended Polytechnic High School in Los Angeles. She intended to pursue a career in business, but was persuaded by friends to try acting. She made her film debut in a bit part in the 1927 film Long Pants, starring Harry Langdon. That same year, she was awarded an Al Christie comedy leading lady film contract in May 1927. She appeared in film comedies with Bobby Vernon and Neal Burns. In 1928, Christy was selected by Harold Lloyd from more than fifty applicants to play his leading lady in the comedy Speedy (1928). That same year, she was selected one of thirteen WAMPAS Baby Stars.

Following her success in Speedy, Christy vacationed in New York. When she returned to Hollywood, she discovered that she had been forgotten. She returned to acting with parts in collegian film serials with Universal Pictures. In 1931, Christy sued the Herbert M. Baruch Corporation for $100,730 in damages. She said she sustained multiple fractures and other injuries when she drove her car into a ditching machine, which she contended was left on the highway by the defendants, without the proper lights. It is not clear what the verdict was. She made her last onscreen appearance in the 1932 film Behind Stone Walls, starring Edward J. Nugent.

Personal life and death
Christy married Robert Lee More Jr., and they lived on the Waggoner Ranch in Texas. She died in Vernon, Texas of a heart attack in 1987, aged 82.

Filmography

References

 Los Angeles Times, "Harold Lloyd Finds Lead In Ann Christy", July 9, 1927, Page A7.
 Los Angeles Times, "Comedy Recruits", July 17, 1927, Page J4.
 Los Angeles Times, "World Travel Is Cherished Ambition Of Leading Lady", July 24, 1927, Page C13.
 Los Angeles Times, "Jury Hearing Ann Christy Tale of Crash", April 15, 1931, Page A5.
 Olean, New York Evening Times, "Movie Chat", June 5, 1930, Page 11.

External links

 
 Ann Christy at Virtual History

1905 births
1987 deaths
Actresses from California
American film actresses
American silent film actresses
People from Logansport, Indiana
20th-century American actresses
WAMPAS Baby Stars